The Laboratory for Experimental Medicine and Surgery in Primates (LEMSIP) was a New York University research facility founded in 1965 by Edward Goldsmith and Jan Moor-Jankowski. The Tuxedo, New York-based outfit was a prominent vendor of primates and primate parts in the New York metropolitan area. These were used by area scientists for transplantation and virus research. The institute closed in 1998.

The facility was the subject of a documentary produced by National Geographic featuring Jane Goodall. The award-winning episode, Chimp Rescue, was broadcast in 1998, shortly after the closure of the facility. The documentary chronicled James Mahoney's efforts to save approximately one hundred primates prior to the closure of the facility.

One of the likely contributing factors to the demise of LEMSIP was the revision of the caging requirements prescribed by the USDA. The upgrades would have cost the university at least US$2 million. As a result, custody of several animals were passed on to the Coulston Foundation.

Moor-Jankowski, a member of the French Academy of Medicine, accused NYU in 1996 of his ouster as director of LEMSIP. He alleged that this act was retaliation for whistle-blowing on former NYU primate addiction researcher Ron Wood.

References
"Lethal Kinship", a report on the chimpanzees of The Coulston Foundation (in PDF format) (in DOC format)
Society and Animals Forum December 1996 issue reporting on Moor-Jankowski's suit against New York University

External links
Commensurating the closure of Coulston
Animal Advocates Protest Plans for a Primate Lab, New York Times excerpt
NYU / LEMSIP timeline by Satya magazine (archived link)

New York University
1965 establishments in New York (state)
1997 disestablishments in New York (state)
Animal testing in the United States
Animal testing on non-human primates